The women's 400 metres at the 2004 Summer Olympics as part of the athletics program were held at the Athens Olympic Stadium from August 21 to 24.

The first round had split a full roster of runners into eight heats with the first three gaining a direct qualification and then the next six fastest across all heats advancing to the semifinals. The top two runners in each of the three semifinal heats moved on directly to the final, and they are immediately joined by the next two fastest from any of the semifinals.

Coming into the final, the fastest qualifiers were Monique Hennagan and Natalya Antyukh challenging each other in their semi final, Tonique Williams-Darling racing DeeDee Trotter in theirs, with world champion Ana Guevara cruising her semi final just staying ahead of Christine Amertil.  In the final, Hennagan again went for the lead with Amertil and Natalya Nazarova each taking their shot at her in the first 200, only to fade after.  Starting slightly slower, Williams came on strongly on the backstretch, marked by Guevara around the second turn.  Coming off the turn Guevara had Williams where she wanted her, and Sanya Richards about even with Hennigan a couple of steps behind, with Antyukh and Trotter another step behind.  Less than 50 meters from the finish, Guevara moved into the lead, but Williams kicked it into a different gear and pulled away to finish with gold.  On the inside, Trotter rocketed past Richards and was gaining on Hennagan.  Hennagan tried to fight, long striding with a slowing cadence to the finish, losing ground to a fast closing Antyukh.  Defeated, Guevara gave up the fight and glided across the finish line with silver.  3 meters back, Antyukh clearly beat a wilting Hennagan, who still managed to hold off the fast closing Trotter.

Records
, the existing World and Olympic records were as follows.

No new records were set during the competition.

Qualification
The qualification period for athletics was 1 January 2003 to 9 August 2004. For the men's 400 metres, each National Olympic Committee was permitted to enter up to three athletes that had run the race in 51.50 seconds or faster during the qualification period. If an NOC had no athletes that qualified under that standard, one athlete that had run the race in 52.30 seconds or faster could be entered.

Schedule
All times are Eastern European Summer Time (UTC+3)

Results

Round 1
Qualification rule: The first three finishers in each heat (Q) plus the next six fastest overall runners (q) advanced to the semifinals.

Heat 1

Heat 2

Heat 3

Heat 4

Heat 5

Heat 6

Semifinals
Qualification rule: The first two finishers in each heat (Q) plus the next two fastest overall runners (q) moved on to the final.

Semifinal 1

Semifinal 2

Semifinal 3

Final

References

External links
 IAAF Athens 2004 Olympic Coverage

W
400 metres at the Olympics
2004 in women's athletics
Women's events at the 2004 Summer Olympics